The Lady is one of Britain's longest-running women's magazines. It has been in continuous publication since 1885 and is based in London. It is particularly notable for its classified advertisements for domestic service and child care; it also has extensive listings of holiday properties.

History and profile
The magazine was founded by Thomas Gibson Bowles (1842–1922), the maternal grandfather of the aristocratic and controversial Mitford sisters. Bowles also founded the English magazine Vanity Fair.

Bowles gave the Mitford girls' father (David Freeman-Mitford, 2nd Baron Redesdale) his first job: general manager of the magazine. Early contributors included Nancy Mitford and Lewis Carroll, who compiled a puzzle for the title.

In November 2008, Bowles' great-grandson, Ben Budworth, took the reins as publisher on behalf of the family and set about modernising its style. As part of this process, Budworth appointed Rachel Johnson as the magazine's ninth editor in September 2009. She took over from Arline Usden who became an editor at large. A Channel 4 programme, The Lady and the Revamp, screened in March 2010, followed the new editor in her quest to raise awareness of the magazine and increase circulation. Johnson's axing of The Lady Laughs, a cartoon series by Patricia Drennan that ran from 2000 to 2009, led to complaints by readers. In response, Johnson would reply with old issues of the magazine to show how bland it historically had been.

Matt Warren was appointed the tenth editor in January 2012. In November 2013, he was named Editor of the Year (Women's Brand Weekly or Fortnightly) by the British Society of Magazine Editors. In 2014, he was Highly Commended in the Editor of the Year category at the PPA Independent Publisher Awards. The magazine specialises in quirky, entertaining and informative features and quality writing.

Sam Taylor became the magazine's eleventh editor in August 2015. Under her editorship, the magazine has been shortlisted for multiple awards, including PPA Cover of the Year (2016), PPA Cover of the Year 2017  and BSME Cover of the Year 2018. Sam Taylor was shortlisted for Editor of The Year, Women's Brand 2016 at the BSME awards. 

The Lady moved to Borehamwood in Hertfordshire and Bylaugh Hall in Norfolk on 1 October 2019. 
Helen Budworth is the current Acting Editor as of October 2022.

In popular culture
The popular television series Downton Abbey mentions The Lady more than once in the context of advertising for ladies' maids and housekeepers. In Good Omens, a character advertises in The Lady for a nanny. In March 2010, on the long-running television series, Coronation Street, Rita Sullivan found advertised in The Lady the services of Lewis Archer, a male escort, who would later seduce another character and steal her life savings.

References

External links
The Lady Magazine, Official website
The Lady Jobs Board, Jobs Board
The Lady Directory, Commercial Directory
Subscription page, Subscription page

1885 establishments in the United Kingdom
Weekly magazines published in the United Kingdom
Women's magazines published in the United Kingdom
Magazines published in London
Magazines established in 1885